Valfara (also Romanized as Valfarā) is a village in Anzan-e Gharbi Rural District, in the Central District of Bandar-e Gaz County, Golestan Province, Iran. At the 2006 census, its population was 328, in 86 families.

References 

Populated places in Bandar-e Gaz County